Santa Cruz Tacache de Mina is a town and municipality in Oaxaca in south-western Mexico. The municipality covers an area of  km². 
It is part of the Huajuapan District in the north of the Mixteca Region.

In 2020, the town had a total population of 2,940, growing 12.8% from 2010.

References

Municipalities of Oaxaca